Camille Dias (born 28 August 1996 in Leysin, Switzerland) is a Swiss-Portuguese alpine skier. She competed for Portugal at the 2014 Winter Olympics in the slalom and giant slalom. Dias is the daughter of emigrants from Portugal who now live in Switzerland, which allows her to compete for the country.

See also
Portugal at the 2014 Winter Olympics

References

External links
 

1996 births
Living people
People from Aigle District
Swiss female alpine skiers
Portuguese female alpine skiers
Olympic alpine skiers of Portugal
Alpine skiers at the 2014 Winter Olympics
Swiss people of Portuguese descent
Citizens of Portugal through descent
Sportspeople from the canton of Vaud